The European Ski Federation (ESF) is the official federation regulating skiing within the continent of Europe and is responsible for the representation of skiing within the greater European Union over the disciplines of alpine skiing, Nordic skiing, and snowboarding. The goal of the ESF is to strengthen Europe's voice in international skiing and promoting winter tourism in Europe.

History 
The ESF was founded in Munich on 5 February 2009 by the four nations of Austria, France, Italy, and Switzerland. The four nations were represented by Peter Schröcksnadel, who would become the first President of the Federation for Österreichischer Skiverband, Alain Méthiaz for the Fédération Française de Ski, Giovanni Morzenti for the Federazione Italiana Sport Invernali and Dr. Urs Lehmann for Swiss-Ski, respectively.

Members 
The original four members are the Österreichischer Skiverband representing Austria, the Fédération Française de Ski representing France, the Federazione Italiana Sport Invernali representing Italy, and Swiss-Ski representing Switzerland. Since 2009 the number of members has increased to 11.

 Österreichischer Skiverband, . President Peter Schröcksnadel
 Belarusian Alpine Skiing and Snowboard Federation, President Natalya Petkevich
 Fédération Française de Ski, President Michel Vion
 Winter Sports Federation of Georgia, President George Ramishvili
 Hungarian Ski Federation, President Dr. Klára Kaszó
 Federazione Italiana Sport Invernali, President Flavio Roda
 Latvian Ski Association, President Vairis Brize
 Liechtensteinischer Skiverband, President Andreas Wenzel
 National Skiing Association of Lithuania, President Remigijus Arlauskas
 Russian Ski and Snowboard Association, President Andrey Bokarev
 Swiss Ski, President Dr. Urs Lehmann

Presidents of the ESF 

 Peter Schröcksnadel, 2009–2012, 
 Dr. Klára Kaszó, 2012-,

Controversy 
The first competition officially organised by the ESF occurred on 7 November 2009 at the Amnéville Indoor Facility in Amnéville, France officially named the "European Indoor Championships" was declared illegal by President of the International Ski Federation Gian-Franco Kasper. The two slalom races were divided into male and female with Jean-Baptiste Grange and Veronika Zuzulová receiving gold medals, respectively.

References 

International Ski Federation